Antonio Sbardella (17 October 1925 – 14 January 2002) was an Italian football player, referee and sports official. He is best known for refereeing at the 1970 FIFA World Cup.

Career
Born in Palestrina near Rome, Sbardella first got involved in football playing as a goalkeeper at youth levels of the local powerhouse Lazio. However Sbardella never appeared in the Serie A as he failed to rise through the ranks at Lazio, and he eventually finished his playing career at Artiglio, a small Rome-based Serie C club.

He then took up refereeing, and in his domestic career he officiated a total of 167 Serie A matches. Along with Concetto Lo Bello he was considered one of the top two Italian referees of the 1960s and 1970s.

The pinnacle of his career came at the 1970 FIFA World Cup in Mexico, in which he refereed two matches, including the third place play-off between West Germany and Uruguay. Sbardella had been designated to referee the final, but was eventually replaced by East Germany's Rudi Glöckner because Italy national football team had reached the final.

In club football his highlights include officiating two Coppa Italia finals (the 1963 final between Atalanta and Torino and the 1966 final between Catanzaro and Fiorentina), and the second leg of the 1967 Inter-Cities Fairs Cup final between Leeds United and Dinamo Zagreb.

After retiring from refereeing, Sbardella became a Sport Manager. He managed at Lazio, Roma and Triestina football clubs in the 1970s and 1980s. The greatest satisfactions came from the period spent at Lazio, when together with Tommaso Maestrelli, he managed to build an unrepeatable superb team with many unruly talents, who kept at bay but gave to the club of president Lenzini the Italian championship of 1974.

References

External links
 
 
 

1925 births
2002 deaths
People from Palestrina
Italian football referees
FIFA World Cup referees
1970 FIFA World Cup referees
Sportspeople from the Metropolitan City of Rome Capital